Marriage a la Carte is a three-act Broadway musical comedy composed and written by C. M. S. McLellan and scored by Ivan Caryll. The play was staged by Austen Hurgon with musical direction provided by J. Sebastian Hiller and Carl H. Engel. Marriage a la Carte opened on January 2, 1911 at the Casino Theatre and had a run of 64 performances.

Synopsis
The play starred newcomer Emmy Wehlen and was set in England. The plot revolves around Mrs. Ponsonby de Coutts Wragge, recently engaged to Lord Mirables, and her former husbands (Ponsonby de Coutts Wragge and Napoleon Pettingill) who reappear in her life after a long absence.

Reviews
The New York Times, January 3, 1911: 
 Marriage a la Carte has charm, distinction, humor, pretty music, pretty girls and clever comedians. What more could one want from a musical comedy? And that is what Marriage a la Carte is, a real musical comedy. 

Theatre Magazine, March, 1911:
 “The title of the new musical comedy, "Marriage a la Carte," by C. M. S. McClellan, has in itself no meaning that we can discover, and there is nothing in the play itself to elucidate its meaning. The title is as silly and dull as the action which seeks in vain to unfold itself on the stage." The critic went on to comment on Wehlen's New York debut, ”A new face and a new force comes to us for the first time in the person of Miss Emmy Wehlen, trained in Germany mainly on the Munich stage, and for a year or so past active on the London stage. She is a blonde, blue-eyed person, with considerable grace and intelligence, who sings and dances well, and has charms that are distinctly individual and consequently new to us. Her best song is "Silly Cock-a-Doodle-Doo," which she dances with Dick (Mr. C. Morton Horne)."

Songs

Thrifty Little Marel
Of All Her Sex a Paragon
For I'm Just I
Smile, Smile, Smile
Silly Cock-a-Doodle-Doo
Captain Dinklepop
Such a Bore
Oh, Rosalie
It's Not the Same at All
Pass it Along to the Frog
Marriage a la Carte (Finale)

Cast

Marie Ashton - Euryanthe Bowers
Ida Barnard - Primrose Farmilow
Esther Bissett - Sheila Wragge
Norman A. Blume - Jimmy Wragge
Charles Brown - Cuthbert Coddington
Cyril Chadwick - Ponsonby de Coutts Wragge
Harry Conor - Napoleon Pettingill
Maria Davis - Mrs. Ponsonby de Coutts Wragge
Joe Doner - Thomas Bolingbroke Mullens
A. W. Fleming - Mr. Pink
Jack Hagner - Young Micklethorpe
Rosina Henley - Molly
Jack F. Henry - Eustace Haws
C. Morton Horne - Hon. Richard Mirables
Harry Kelly - Footman
Diane Otse - Elsie Tattleby
Frances Reeve - Iseult Punchum
Elsa Ryan - Daisy Dimsy
Quentin Todd - Aubrey Hipps
J. R. Torrens - Gerald Gifford
Harold Vizard - Lord Mirables
Emmy Wehlen - Rosalie

References

1911 musicals
Broadway musicals